The Cayman least gecko (Sphaerodactylus argivus) is a species of lizard in the family Sphaerodactylidae. It is endemic to Cayman Brac in the Cayman Islands.

References

Sphaerodactylus
Reptiles described in 1888
Endemic fauna of the Cayman Islands
Taxa named by Samuel Garman